Splendor or splendour (see spelling differences) may refer to:

Arts and entertainment
 Splendor (game), a card-based board game published in 2014 by Marc André
 Splendour (play), a 2000 play by Abi Morgan
 Splendor: A Luxe Novel, a 2009 novel by Anna Godbersen

Films
 Splendor (1935 film), an American film
 Splendor (1989 film), an Italian film by director Ettore Scola
 Splendor (1999 film), a film by Gregg Araki
 American Splendor (2003 film), an American biographical film by Harvey Pekar

Music
 Splender an alternative rock band from New York City

Ships
 Carnival Splendor, a cruise ship
 HMS Rosebay (K286), previously known as the USS Splendor
 London Splendour, two tanker ships of London & Overseas Freighters, the second of which is now the Front Splendour owned by Frontline Shipping

Other uses
 Splendour (apple), a cultivar developed in New Zealand
 Splendor (cycling team), a professional cycling team active during the 1980s
 Hero Honda Splendor, a motorcycle

See also
 Splendor in the Grass (disambiguation)
 
 
 Splenda, an artificial sweetener
 Splender, rock band from New York City, New York, USA